Karl-Axel Kullerstrand (March 1, 1892 – May 14, 1981) was a Swedish track and field athlete who competed in the 1912 Summer Olympics. In 1912 he finished eighth in the high jump competition.

References

External links
profile 

1892 births
1981 deaths
Swedish male high jumpers
Olympic athletes of Sweden
Athletes (track and field) at the 1912 Summer Olympics
20th-century Swedish people